Sidi Ghanem may refer to:
Sidi Ghanem, Chichaoua Province
Sidi Ghanem, Rehamna Province